Road 52 is a road in western Iran connecting Borujerd to Nahavand and Kangavar. This road is a transit road connecting Arak to western Iran.

References

External links 

 Iran road map on Young Journalists Club

Roads in Iran